Robin Appleyard, (born 10 May 1964), is a British former professional motorcycle racer and race team manager. He competed in the 125cc class of Grand Prix motorcycle racing from 1983 to 1996.

Appleyard was born in Keighley, Yorkshire. He won the 125cc Marlboro Clubman's British Championship in 1982, the Shell Oils Championship in 1984, Supercup 125cc Championship twice (1993, 1996) and was 125cc National Cup champion in 1995.

When his own racing career was over he moved into team management where he was Red Bull Rookie manager and is currently managing Team Appleyard/Macadam.

References

External links

 1986 Motoprix 125cc UK Championship
Team Appleyard/Macadam
Moto GP results

1964 births
Living people
Sportspeople from Keighley
English motorcycle racers
125cc World Championship riders